Lapinig, officially the Municipality of Lapinig, is a 5th class municipality in the province of Northern Samar, Philippines. According to the 2020 census, it has a population of 11,844 people.

It is Northern Samar's boundary municipality with Eastern Samar on its coastal side in the Pacific. To the south, it is bounded by Arteche, to the west by Jipapad, to the northeast by the Pacific Ocean, and in the northwest by Gamay.

Geography

Barangays
Lapinig is politically subdivided into 15 barangays.
 Alang-alang
 Bagacay
 Cahagwayan
 Can Maria
 Can Omanio
 Imelda
 Lapinig del Sur (Poblacion)
 Lapinig del Norte (Poblacion)
 Lo-ok
 Mabini
 May-igot
 Palanas
 Pio Del Pilar
 Potong
 Potong Del Sur

Climate

Demographics

Economy

References

External links
 [ Philippine Standard Geographic Code]
 Philippine Census Information
 Local Governance Performance Management System

Municipalities of Northern Samar